Lincoln City Football Club, an English association football club based in Lincoln, Lincolnshire, was founded in , and first entered the FA Cup in the 1884–85 season. When nationally organised league football in England began, the club joined the Combination, a league set up to provide organised football for those clubs not invited to join the Football League which was to start the same year. When that league folded, Lincoln became founder members of the Midland League, and won the inaugural league title. They then spent a year in the Football Alliance before being elected to the newly formed Second Division of the Football League. Lincoln moved in and out of the Football League until they became founder members of the Football League Third Division North in 1921. They remained in the Football League until 1987, when they became the first club to suffer automatic relegation to the Conference National. They returned to the League after just one season, remained at that level until relegated again in 2011, and returned once more in 2017.

All players who have made between 25 and 99 appearances in senior first-team matches for Lincoln City, in league or cup competition, are listed below. Some hold club records: Allan Hall scored 41 goals in the 40-game league season as Lincoln won the 1931–32 Third Division North title, and Jimmy Bauchop was the oldest known player to score for the club, at 37 years 295 days. The club made their record signing when they paid £75,000 to Carlisle United for Dean Walling in 1997. Other players took part in significant matches in the history of the club. William and James Gresham, Ned Mettam, Isaac Moore and Slotch Shaw appeared in Lincoln's first Football League match in 1892.

Con Moulson, Keith Alexander and Phil Stant went on to manage the team. Harry Pugh was the first man in this appearance range to have been capped by his country while a Lincoln City player, when he represented Wales against Scotland in 1900. Eight other men have played senior international football for their country while a Lincoln player, most recently Arnaud Mendy, who played for Guinea-Bissau in an Africa Cup of Nations qualifier in 2014. Delroy Facey of Grenada and Gareth McAuley (Northern Ireland) are the club's most capped players, each having played five times for their country while registered with Lincoln. As of the date below, five men have ended their Lincoln careers on 99 competitive appearances; the most recent, midfielder Dany N'Guessan, was with the club from 2007 to 2009.

Key

Players with 25 to 99 appearances

Footnotes

Player statistics include games played while on loan from:

References
General
 Appearances and goals up to and including the 2012–13 season from individual player pages linked from the alphabetical list at the Lincoln City FC Archive:  Although this site is partly subscription-based, only free-access sections are used for reference. If pop-up login dialogue boxes appear, press the "Cancel" button to proceed.
 Appearances and goals from the 2013–14 season onwards referenced individually to player pages at the Soccerway website: 
 Appearances and goals from the 2017–18 season onwards referenced to Lincoln City's squad statistics at Soccerbase: 
 International appearances: 
 Playing position (pre-1940 players): 
 Playing position (post-1940 players): 
 Playing position (post-2010 players) from individual player pages linked from Lincoln City's squad statistics at Soccerbase: 
 Wartime appearances: 

Specific

Players
 
Lincoln City
Association football player non-biographical articles